Diego Flaccadori (born 5 April 1996) is an Italian professional basketball player for Bayern Munich, currently on loan to his former team Aquila Trento of the Italian Lega Basket Serie A (LBA). He stands 195 cm (6’4¾") tall, and he can play at both the point guard and shooting guard positions, with shooting guard being his primary position.

Professional career 
Flaccadori came through the youth ranks of Excelsior Pallacanestro Bergamo, before transferring to Basket Treviglio, where he made his debut for the club's men's team in the amateur Italian third division during the 2013–14 campaign. He played 26 games in his first year in men's basketball, averaging 2.5 points a contest.

Flaccadori then joined Dolomiti Energia Trento of the professional Italian top-flight level league Serie A in August 2014. In his first season with the team, he saw the court in 34 games in the Italian League, scoring 2.8 points per outing. In the 2015–16 season, he marked his debut on the European club stage, participating in the European 2nd tier Eurocup competition with Trento.

He was an early entry candidate for the 2016 NBA draft, but later removed his name from the list.

On July 31, 2019, Flaccadori signed a two-year contract with Bayern Munich of the Basketball Bundesliga (BBL) and the EuroLeague.

On July 20, 2021, Flaccadori returned to his former team Aquila Trento in the Italian Serie A for one year loan.

National team 
Flaccadori was part of the Italian junior national teams on several occasions. He competed in the 2012 FIBA Europe Under-16 Championship, guided the Italian Under-18 national team to gold at the 2014 Albert Schweitzer Tournament, he was picked by the website Eurobasket.com for their unofficial 2014 FIBA Europe Under-18 Championship's Second Team the same year, was named to Eurobasket.com's unofficial 2015 FIBA Under-19 World Championship All-Second Team, and also played at the 2015 FIBA Europe Under-20 Championship.

References

External links 
 Diego Flaccadori at eurocupbasketball.com
 Diego Flaccadori at fiba.com
 Diego Flaccadori at fibaeurope.com
 Diego Flaccadori at draftexpress.com
 Diego Flaccadori at eurobasket.com
 Diego Flaccadori at legabasket.it 
 Diego Flaccadori at nbadraft.net

1996 births
Living people
Aquila Basket Trento players
FC Bayern Munich basketball players
Italian expatriate basketball people in Germany
Italian men's basketball players
Lega Basket Serie A players
People from Seriate
Point guards
Shooting guards
Sportspeople from the Province of Bergamo